Ascochyta tritici is a fungal plant pathogen that causes Ascochyta leaf spot on barley, wheat and maize.

See also
List of Ascochyta species

References

tritici
Fungal plant pathogens and diseases
Barley diseases
Wheat diseases
Maize diseases